The women's lightweight (52 kg/114.4 lbs) Full-Contact category at the W.A.K.O. European Championships 2004 in Budva was the second lightest of the female Full-Contact tournaments and involved eight fighters.  Each of the matches was three rounds of two minutes each and were fought under Full-Contact kickboxing rules.

The tournament gold medallist was Mette Solli from Norway who defeated Germany's Fatma Akyüz in the final by unanimous decision, with the unlucky Akyüz claiming her fourth silver medal in a row at a W.A.K.O. championships.  Lidia Andreeva and Tatiana Rinaldi from Russia and Italy received bronze medals.

Results

Key

See also
List of WAKO Amateur European Championships
List of WAKO Amateur World Championships
List of female kickboxers

References

External links
 WAKO World Association of Kickboxing Organizations Official Site

W.A.K.O. European Championships 2004 (Budva)